Haven is a city in Reno County, Kansas, United States. As of the 2020 census, the population of the city was 1,170.

History
Haven was laid out in 1886, and incorporated as a city in 1901. The first post office in Haven was established in 1873.

The local high school football team was on the winning side of a lopsided football game against another school from across the county in Sylvia. Played in 1927 with a final score of 256–0, the game produced multiple national and state high school records. As of 2016, the state records include: Total points scored, points by both teams, widest margin, widest shutout, most touchdowns (38), and most rushing touchdowns (30). Also, Haven student Elvin McCoy holds state records for both individual points per game with 90 and individual touchdowns scored per game with 13. The introduction of the mercy rule means that many of these records will likely never be broken.

In 2022, the mayor and council unanimously voted to remove “In God We Trust” decals from the city's police vehicles

Geography
Haven is located at  (37.902306, -97.780957).

Area events
 Haven Fall Festival, held on the second weekend of October each year.

Demographics

2010 census
As of the census of 2010, there were 1,237 people, 492 households, and 337 families residing in the city. The racial makeup of the city was 94.5% White, 0.7% African American, 1.7% Native American, 0.2% Asian, 0.2% from other races, and 2.7% from two or more races. Hispanic or Latino of any race were 2.7% of the population.

There were 492 households, of which 33.1% had children under the age of 18 living with them, 55.5% were married couples living together, 8.5% had a female householder with no husband present, 4.5% had a male householder with no wife present, and 31.5% were non-families. 28.3% of all households were made up of individuals, and 11.6% had someone living alone who was 65 years of age or older. The average household size was 2.51 and the average family size was 3.07.

The median age in the city was 37.1 years. 26.9% of residents were under the age of 18; 8.3% were between the ages of 18 and 24; 22.2% were from 25 to 44; 28.2% were from 45 to 64; and 14.4% were 65 years of age or older. The gender makeup of the city was 47.8% male and 52.2% female.

2000 census
As of the census of 2000, there were 1,175 people, 463 households, and 325 families residing in the city. The racial makeup of the city was 97.62% White, 0.17% African American, 0.77% Native American, 0.34% from other races, and 1.11% from two or more races. Hispanic or Latino of any race were 0.94% of the population.

There were 463 households, out of which 35.6% had children under the age of 18 living with them, 58.5% were married couples living together, 8.4% had a female householder with no husband present, and 29.6% were non-families. 26.6% of all households were made up of individuals, and 13.6% had someone living alone who was 65 years of age or older. The average household size was 2.54 and the average family size was 3.10.

In the city, the population was spread out, with 29.4% under the age of 18, 7.6% from 18 to 24, 27.6% from 25 to 44, 19.8% from 45 to 64, and 15.6% who were 65 years of age or older. The median age was 36 years. For every 100 females, there were 93.9 males. For every 100 females age 18 and over, there were 90.6 males.

The median income for a household in the city was $38,239, and the median income for a family was $45,682. Males had a median income of $34,125 versus $20,662 for females. The per capita income for the city was $16,319. About 5.6% of families and 7.0% of the population were below the poverty line, including 6.7% of those under age 18 and 8.0% of those age 65 or over.

Government
The Haven government consists of a mayor and five council members. The council meets the 1st and 3rd Monday of each month at 7PM.

Education
The community is served by Haven USD 312 public school district.

Notable people
 Andy Dirks, professional baseball player for the Detroit Tigers. He competed in the 2012 World Series.
 Flossie Page, a supercentenarian, lived 112.7 years (1893–2006). At the time she died she was the 6th oldest person in the United States and the oldest person from Kansas to have ever lived.

References

Further reading

External links

 
 Haven - Directory of Public Officials
 Haven city map, KDOT

Cities in Kansas
Cities in Reno County, Kansas
1886 establishments in Kansas
Populated places established in 1886